The Welsh Rugby Union Division Three West A  is a rugby union league in Wales. The founding of the Division in 2014 was a result of the decision by the Welsh Rugby Union to localise club rugby, after they concluded that players were not willing to travel long distances to play their matches.

Competition format

Competition
There are 10 clubs in the WRU Division Three West A. During the course of a season (which lasts from September to May) each club plays every other team twice, once at their home ground and once at that of their opponents for a total of 18 games for each club, with a total of 180 games in each season. Teams receive four points for a win and two points for a draw, an additional bonus point is awarded to either team if they score four tries or more in a single match. No points are awarded for a loss though the losing team can gain a bonus point for finishing the match within seven points of the winning team. Teams are ranked by total points, then the number of tries scored and then points difference. At the end of each season, the club with the most points is crowned as champion. If points are equal the tries scored then points difference determines the winner. The team who is declared champion at the end of the season is eligible for promotion to the WRU Division Two West. There is no relegation from this Division.

2014–15 season

League teams

 Pontyberem RFC
 Lampeter Town RFC
 Penybanc RFC
 Tumble RFC
 Burry Port RFC
 Trimsaran RFC
 Nantgaredig RFC
 Bynea RFC
 New Dock Stars RFC
 Cefneithin RFC
 Llandybie RFC

2014–15 table

2015–16 season

League teams

 Haverfordwest RFC
 Cardigan RFC
 Milford Haven RFC
 Pembroke RFC
 Laugharne Town RFC
 Pembroke Dock Harlequins RFC
 Neyland RFC
 St Clears RFC
 St Davids RFC
 Llangwm RFC

2015–16 table

References

5